The European Review of Books is a cultural and literary magazine, featuring essays, fiction and poetry. The magazine is published in print and online, and it contains articles written in English language and in a writer's own tongue.

History
In May 2021 the founders launched a crowdfunding campaign to raise the first resources which would bring the magazine to life.
The first issue was released in June 2022.

References

External links

Book review magazines
Magazines published in Europe
English-language magazines
Multilingual magazines
Cultural magazines
Online literary magazines

Literary magazines published in the Netherlands